Jovino Soares Viana Júnior (born July 21, 1985), known as just Juca Viana, is a Brazilian footballer (midfielder) currently playing for Pão de Açúcar EC.

External links
 90minut.pl Profile

1985 births
Living people
Brazilian footballers
Brazilian expatriate footballers
Clube Atlético Juventus players
Grêmio Osasco Audax Esporte Clube players
ŁKS Łódź players
FC Vilnius players
Expatriate footballers in Poland
Brazilian expatriate sportspeople in Poland
Association football midfielders